Nenad Đurović (Cyrillic: Ненад Ђуровић; born 17 January 1986) is a Montenegrin retired football defender who mostly played for Sutjeska Nikšić.

Club career
The first club for which he played for was FK Sutjeska Nikšić from his hometown. He was eventually traded to FK Zeta and played with that team until he made his first career move to a foreign club by signing with Spartak Trnava in January 2008. He played again with FK Zeta before signing with FK Inđija that finished top in the Serbian First League achieving promotion to the Serbian SuperLiga. After playing the first half of the 2010–11 season in Serbia, he moved at winter break to Hungary and signed with Szolnoki MAV FC. In January 2012, after a half season spent with FC Petrolul Ploiești in Romanian Liga I, he returned to FK Sutjeska Nikšić playing now in the Montenegrin First League.

He was part of the Serbia and Montenegro under-19 team at the 2005 UEFA European Under-19 Championship. He also played for the Montenegrin under-21 team.

Honours
Spartak Trnava
Slovak Cup runners-up: 2008
Inđija
Serbian First League: 2009–10
Sutjeska
Montenegrin First League: 2012–13, 2013–14

References

External links
 Profile and stats at Srbijafudbal

1986 births
Living people
Footballers from Nikšić
Association football central defenders
Serbia and Montenegro footballers
Montenegrin footballers
Montenegro youth international footballers
FK Sutjeska Nikšić players
FK Zeta players
FC Spartak Trnava players
FK Inđija players
Szolnoki MÁV FC footballers
FC Petrolul Ploiești players
Nyíregyháza Spartacus FC players
FK Mogren players
Montenegrin First League players
Slovak Super Liga players
Serbian SuperLiga players
Nemzeti Bajnokság I players
Liga I players
Montenegrin expatriate footballers
Expatriate footballers in Slovakia
Montenegrin expatriate sportspeople in Slovakia
Expatriate footballers in Serbia
Montenegrin expatriate sportspeople in Serbia
Expatriate footballers in Hungary
Montenegrin expatriate sportspeople in Hungary
Expatriate footballers in Romania
Montenegrin expatriate sportspeople in Romania